The 1998 Solihull Metropolitan Borough Council election took place on 7 May 1998 to elect members of Solihull Metropolitan Borough Council in the West Midlands, England. 
One third of the council was up for election and the council stayed under no overall control.

Campaign
Before the election the Conservative party held 17 seats, compared to 16 for Labour and 12 Liberal Democrats. However the council was run by the Labour party who governed with an agreement with the Liberal Democrats. With the split in seats between the parties the council was expected to remain without any party having a majority with Labour defending 6 seats, compared to 5 for the Conservatives and 4 for the Liberal Democrats. Meanwhile, the independent candidates who were defending a seat in Shirley South and 2 seats in Shirley West ward were expected to come under pressure. During the campaign another independent councillor Trevor Eames, who was not defending a seat in the election, resigned from the council after being jailed for 7 years causing a by-election to be held later in the summer.

Election result
The results saw all 3 independents who were defending seats defeated, reducing the number of Independent Ratepayers on the council to 2. Labour gained 1 seat from the independents in Shirley West, while the Conservative took the other 2 in Shirley South and Shirley West. The Conservatives also won a seat from the Liberal Democrats in Packwood ward, with the former leader of the council Ken Meeson being returned to the council. Overall turnout in the election was 29%, varying between a high of 40% and a low of 15% in Smithswood ward.

Following the election the Conservatives elected a new group leader, Ted Richards, after the previous leader Ron Herd stepped down. However, despite holding 20 seats, compared to 17 for Labour and 11 for the Liberal Democrats, the Conservatives remained in opposition, with Labour running the council with support from the Liberal Democrats.

|- style="background-color:#F9F9F9"
! style="background-color: " |
| Independent Ratepayers & Residents 
| align="right" | 0
| align="right" | 0
| align="right" | 2
| align="right" | -2
| align="right" | 0.0
| align="right" | 4.6
| align="right" | 2,132
| align="right" | -3.4%
|-

This result had the following consequences for the total number of seats on the council after the elections :

Ward results

|- style="background-color:#F6F6F6"
! style="background-color: " |
| colspan="2"   | Conservative gain from Independent Ratepayers
| align="right" | Swing
| align="right" | +35.4
|-

|- style="background-color:#F6F6F6"
! style="background-color: " |
| colspan="2"   | Labour gain from Independent Ratepayers
| align="right" | Swing
| align="right" | 
|-

By-elections between 1998 and 1999

|- style="background-color:#F6F6F6"
! style="background-color: " |
| colspan="2"   | Conservative gain from Independent Ratepayers
| align="right" | Swing
| align="right" | +5.0
|-

References

1998 English local elections
1998
1990s in the West Midlands (county)